"You Are the Best Thing" is the lead single of the album Gossip in the Grain by American folk singer-songwriter Ray LaMontagne released on August 26, 2008, by Stone Dwarf Music, LLC, under license to RCA/JIVE Label Group, a unit of Sony Music Entertainment.

The song hit number five on Billboard Adult Alternative Songs chart, and is currently his only single to chart on the Billboard Hot 100, reaching number 90.

In popular culture
"You Are the Best Thing" was featured in the film I Love You, Man, and in an episode of the Australian TV show Packed to the Rafters. It was also featured in the film Bad Moms, released in 2016.

Singer Jovin Webb sang the song on American Idol season 18 during the Showcase Round at Aulani Resort in Kapolei, Hawaii which aired on March 29, 2020.

Charts

Certifications

References

2008 singles
2008 songs
Jive Records singles
Ray LaMontagne songs
RCA Records singles
Songs written by Ray LaMontagne